Inter-App Audio (IAA) is a deprecated technology developed by Apple Inc. which routes audio and MIDI signals between applications on the iOS mobile operating system. The technology was first introduced in 2013 in iOS 7 and deprecated in 2019 with the release of iOS 13.

Scope 
Inter-App Audio is a host-plugin technology. An IAA host application connects to a node application to send and receive audio, MIDI, timeline information, and other signals.

Node applications 
Node applications can be of the following types:
 Instruments (can receive MIDI signals and produce audio signals)
 Generators (can produce audio signals)
 Effects (can receive, transform and send back audio signals)

Limitations 
At the moment, audio signal routing is only possible with a sampling rate of 44 1 Hz.

Deprecation 
Inter-App Audio was deprecated in 2019 with the release of iOS 13 in favor of the third version of Audio Units.

Competing technologies 
 Audiobus
 Audio Units
 Ableton Link

References

External links 
 IAA Host Application List
 IAA Instrument Application List
 IAA Effect Application List
 Apple WWDC 2013: What's New in Core Audio for iOS

IOS
Music software plugin architectures